Kurttila is a Finnish surname. Notable people with the surname include:

 Keijo Kurttila (born 1975), Finnish cross-country skier
 Scott Kurttila (born  1965), American figure skater

Finnish-language surnames
Surnames of Finnish origin